Washington Township is a township in eastern Berks County, Pennsylvania, United States. The population was 3,810 at the 2010 census.

History
The Barto Bridge, Borneman Mill, Philip Christman House, and Dale Furnace and Forge Historic District are listed on the National Register of Historic Places.

Geography
According to the United States Census Bureau, the township has a total area of 14.0 square miles (36.3 km2), all  land. It is drained by the Perkiomen Creek into the Schuylkill River. The northwestern portion is located in the South Mountains. Washington Township's villages include Barto, Clayton (also in Hereford Township), Dale, and Eshbach.

Adjacent municipalities
Hereford Township (north)
District Township (northwest)
Pike Township (west)
Colebrookdale Township (south)
Douglass Township, Montgomery County (southeast)
Upper Hanover Township, Montgomery County (east)

The township has a hot-summer humid continental climate (Dfa) and is in hardiness zone 6b. The average monthly temperature in Barto ranges from 29.4 °F in January to 74.2 °F in July. 

Washington Township surrounds the boroughs of Bally and Bechtelsville.

Demographics

As of the census of 2000, there were 3,354 people, 1,212 households, and 970 families living in the township.  The population density was 239.2 people per square mile (92.4/km2).  There were 1,250 housing units at an average density of 89.2/sq mi (34.4/km2).  The racial makeup of the township was 97.88% White, 0.75% African American, 0.09% Native American, 0.33% Asian, 0.24% from other races, and 0.72% from two or more races. Hispanic or Latino of any race were 0.66% of the population.

There were 1,212 households, out of which 35.6% had children under the age of 18 living with them, 70.5% were married couples living together, 6.0% had a female householder with no husband present, and 19.9% were non-families. 15.1% of all households were made up of individuals, and 6.0% had someone living alone who was 65 years of age or older.  The average household size was 2.77 and the average family size was 3.08.

In the township the population was spread out, with 25.8% under the age of 18, 6.1% from 18 to 24, 30.8% from 25 to 44, 25.8% from 45 to 64, and 11.5% who were 65 years of age or older.  The median age was 38 years. For every 100 females there were 104.8 males.  For every 100 females age 18 and over, there were 103.7 males.

The median income for a household in the township was $53,241, and the median income for a family was $60,054. Males had a median income of $37,951 versus $26,298 for females. The per capita income for the township was $20,454.  About 2.1% of families and 3.0% of the population were below the poverty line, including 2.3% of those under age 18 and 2.1% of those age 65 or over.

Government and politics

Legislators
State Representative David Maloney Sr., Republican, 130th district
State Senator Judy Schwank, Democrat, 11th district
US Representative Madeleine Dean, Democrat, 4th district

Board of Supervisors
David Moyer, Chairman
Thomas Powanda, Vice Chairman
James Roma

Recreation
One parcel of the Pennsylvania State Game Lands Number 315 is located on Forge Dale Road north of Barto, a second parcel is located along the northern border with Hereford Township.

Transportation

Pennsylvania Route 100 crosses Washington Township north-to-south on its path from Lehigh County to Pottstown via Bally. Other local roads of note include Barto Road, County Line Road, Forgedale Road, Hoffmansville Road, Kutztown Road, and Niantic Road.

References

External links

Official website

Townships in Berks County, Pennsylvania